The Rosie Result is a 2019 novel by Australian novelist Graeme Simsion. The work was first published on 5 February 2019 by Text Publishing.

It is the third and final novel in the Don Tillman trilogy, following from The Rosie Project (2013) and The Rosie Effect (2014).

Synopsis 
The Rosie Result is set in modern-day Melbourne several years into Don Tillman's marriage to Rosie. They have an 11-year-old son, Hudson, who is having difficulties in school and in various social situations. He may or may not be autistic. Don, hoping to be able to help his son in ways that he wished he had been helped when he was a child, sets to work on "The Hudson Project".

Following an awkward incident at the university where Don is employed - the kind of incident of which readers of the previous two books will be all too familiar - Don is accused of racism. He decides to leave his job to focus on taking care of his son.

References 

2019 Australian novels
Australian romance novels
Contemporary romance novels
Literary trilogies
Novels set in Melbourne
Text Publishing books
Novels by Graeme Simsion
Books about autism